The Ancient Landmark Masonic Lodge Number 356 A.F. and A.M. is located in Harrisburg, Missouri and played a major role in the social and educational history of the town. The building was listed on the National Register of Historic Places in 2013 and houses the Order of the Eastern Star. Constructed by the Freemasons, the building served as Harrisburg's school from 1878–1963. A major addition and bell tower have been removed from the structure and time has left the building in dire need of repair.

It was listed on the National Register of Historic Places in 2013.

See also
 Grand Lodge of Missouri

References

Harrisburg, Missouri
Buildings and structures in Boone County, Missouri
Masonic buildings completed in 1878
Masonic buildings in Missouri
Clubhouses on the National Register of Historic Places in Missouri
School buildings on the National Register of Historic Places in Missouri
National Register of Historic Places in Boone County, Missouri